Trescowe is a hamlet north of Germoe in Cornwall, England, United Kingdom.

The name Trescowe is an anglicisation of the Cornish language Treskaw, which contains the words tre, meaning 'farm' or 'settlement', and skaw, meaning 'elder trees'.

References

Hamlets in Cornwall